WRTC-FM is a non-commercial FM radio station based in Hartford, Connecticut, which primarily serves the metropolitan Hartford market. WRTC broadcasts a diverse format featuring nearly 60 weekly programs ranging from rock, jazz, Caribbean, Latin, and soul to hip hop, funk, gospel, blues, and Broadway. The station, owned by Trinity College, can be found on the dial at 89.3 MHz.

Background

WRTC made its on-air debut on February 26, 1947, providing "innovative, community-based programming." It was one of the first stations in the Hartford area to play rock music and today airs more than 40 hours a week of a wide range of rock styles.

Programming

Music and interviews with artists
In the 1970s, Alien Rock was one of the first programs in the state to introduce art, progressive, and punk rock to listeners. Although there’s less progressive and art rock on the air today, it was once a mainstay during the 1970s and still has a place at WRTC, as do album-oriented (AOR) and Indie rock, house music, and techno offerings. 

WRTC also boasts more than 30 hours of jazz programming each week. Styles run the gamut: conventional straight-ahead, fusion, hard bop, modern, and smooth/cool).

The station also runs 20 hours of Caribbean sounds each week, including bomba, calypso, compas, dancehall, lovers rock, merengue, reggaeton, rocksteady, roots reggae, ska, soca, and zouk, and over the years, on-air interviews have been conducted with such artists as: Black Uhuru, Buju Banton, Ken Boothe, Dennis Brown, Jimmy Cliff, Beres Hammond, The Heptones, Luciano, Junior Marvin, Freddie McGregor, Maxi Priest, Shabba Ranks, Shaggy, Sizzla, Toots & the Maytals, Yellowman, and the sons of the late Bob Marley: Julian, Ky-Mani, and Stephen. Every weeknight brings a different spotlight on Latin programming, ranging from Latin contemporary music to salsa, merengue, or bachata.

Soul, funk, and blues music get thorough attention at the station: Midweek, the station that features World O’ Funk, a long-running program featuring material rooted in the foundations of funk to present-day artists. Programming leansheavily on George Clinton’s Parliament and Funkedelic line-ups as well as the horn-laden godfather of soul, James Brown, as well as Sly & The Family Stone, Average White Band, and Mandrill. Regular interviews are conducted with those who made it happen.

Rounding out the genre, Saturday’s Greasy Tracks is steeped in Southern soul, but always manages to mix in late 1960s and early 1970s British blues stylists and extended acid jazz and fusion instrumentals. Since 2010, Greasy Tracks has presented an annual, single-day, Stax Records marathon of six or seven hours. The "Soulsville" special, believed to be the only program of its kind in the country, has featured interviews with 40-plus Stax-specific guests, including a veritable who’s who of Southern soul greats: William Bell, Steve Cropper, Eddie Floyd, Wayne Jackson, and David Porter among them.

Now airing more than 40 hours per week, the Thought Power block of programming debuted in the summer of 1975. It offered an Afrocentric theme merging jazz, R&B, fusion, funk, and reggae, as well as Latin jazz and salsa. At the time, WRTC was one of only two area stations offering "black programming".

Tracing its origin back to the Black Experience block of programs, the formative years of Thought Power focused on public affairs concerns. It produced original, vibrant, educational programming and increased awareness of African-American culture.

Politics
In 1996, WRTC carried the second presidential debate between incumbent Bill Clinton and challenger Bob Dole, moderated by PBS NewsHour host Jim Lehrer in San Diego.

Sports
WRTC’s veteran sportscasters provide home and away game coverage of the Bantams in NESCAC football action in the fall.

Talk radio
The station has long produced programs focusing on community affairs and currently features The Community Talk Show, a bi-weekly panel discussion exploring topics ranging from social welfare, healthcare, and politics to economic development, law enforcement, and unemployment.

Events
WRTC-FM hosts multiple music festivals in Hartford. See Trinity_College_(Connecticut)#Music.

References

External links
WRTC-FM official website

RTC-FM
RTC-FM
Radio stations established in 1947
1947 establishments in Connecticut